Steinbach is a municipality in the district of Kronach in Bavaria in Germany.

History
The village was first mentioned in 1190. Until 1388 it was part of 'Eygen Teuschnitz', a large estate of Langheim monastery.

Economy
Biggest employer is Wiegand-Glas with branches in Großbreitenbach, Slovakia and South Africa.

Events
Every July, an association called "Zechgemeinschaft" celebrates the traditional fair. Unmarried young people dress themselves with the traditional clothes of the village and invite their guests to dance with them to typical music. In August, the rifle club's festival takes place.

References

External links
 

Kronach (district)